Shahd Samer (born 1 January 2003) is an Egyptian synchronized swimmer. She competed in the 2020 Summer Olympics.

References

2003 births
Living people
Synchronized swimmers at the 2020 Summer Olympics
Egyptian synchronized swimmers
Olympic synchronized swimmers of Egypt